Mechanics Hall (Boston, Massachusetts) was a building and community institution on Huntington Avenue at West Newton Street, from 1881 to 1959.  Commissioned by the Massachusetts Charitable Mechanic Association, it was built by the noted architect William Gibbons Preston.  The building was located between the Boston and Albany railroad yards and Huntington avenue.  It was razed for the Prudential Center urban renewal project of the early 1960s.  The site is on the north side of Huntington Avenue, and since 1941 has been served by Prudential Station (nee Mechanics Hall Station) of the MBTA Green Line E branch.

The building's sizable auditorium was host to meetings and conventions.  Over the years the building was host to events such as boat shows, auto shows, dog shows, flower shows and sporting shows. For example, in 1883 the Foreign Exhibition Association held a large exhibit of "foreign arts, manufactures and products". Also in 1883 the Olympian Club held a "floral display and costume carnival" that included indoor rollerskating. It was briefly the home court of the Boston Whirlwinds of the American Basketball League.

Today, the site is the location of the 111 Huntington Avenue.

See also
 Massachusetts Charitable Mechanic Association

Notes

Image gallery
Mechanics Hall, Huntington Avenue (1881–1959)

External links

History and images from the Boston Public Library
Image of exhibit interior, c. 1881
Documents related to the razing of buildings for Prudential site
 Library of Congress, Historic American Buildings Survey. Massachusetts Charitable Mechanics Association, Exhibition Hall, Huntington Avenue & West Newton Street, Boston, Suffolk County, MA
 Library of Congress. Photo of Creatore's Band on steps of Mechanics Building, Huntington Ave, Boston, Mass, 1903, by E. Chickering

Cultural history of Boston
Demolished buildings and structures in Boston
19th century in Boston
20th century in Boston
Back Bay, Boston
Cultural infrastructure completed in 1881
Defunct sports venues in Boston
1881 establishments in Massachusetts
1959 disestablishments in Massachusetts
World's fair sites in the United States
Buildings and structures demolished in 1959